This is a list of WFC compatible games on the Nintendo 3DS handheld game console. Whilst many titles will implement the use of Nintendo Network service, Nintendo-published titles in particular, other titles will be supported by various third-party online services.

Released WFC compatible 3DS games

Notes

See also
 List of Nintendo 3DS games
 List of Nintendo 3DS Download Software
 List of DSiWare games and applications
 List of Nintendo DS Wi-Fi Connection games
 List of Wii Wi-Fi Connection games

3DS Wi-Fi Connection games

 
Video game lists by platform